Sarah Elizabeth Lawson (born 6 August 1928) is an English actress best known for her film and television roles.

Early life
Lawson is the youngest of three children born to Edith (née Monteith) and Noel John Charles Lawson (1887–1964), a naval officer of Irish heritage.

She trained at Webber Douglas Academy of Dramatic Art, then worked in Perth, Ipswich, Felixstowe and London's West End.

Film
Lawson's films have included The Browning Version (1951), The World Ten Times Over and The Devil Rides Out. Her radio work included The Hostage, Inspector West and Kind Sir.

Among her most memorable film appearances was as Marie Eaton in Hammer's The Devil Rides Out (1968), in which her husband Patrick Allen provided the dubbing for actor Leon Greene. She and Allen also starred together in the science fiction thriller Night of the Big Heat (1967). Both films were directed by Terence Fisher.

Television
Lawson's work on television included Time and the Conways, An Ideal Husband, Rupert of Hentzau, Corridors of Power, The White Guard, Crown Court (TV series) ('No Smoke without Fire'), The Odd Man, 'The Trollenberg Terror', (vide (Latin) The Trollenberg Terror film adaptation), Bergerac, and Zero One. She made guest appearances in such series as The Avengers, The Saint,  Gideon's Way, The Professionals, The Persuaders! and Danger Man.

Her most significant TV work was in the Granada TV series The Odd Man, starring Moultrie Kelsall and Edwin Richfield, and written by Scottish TV writer Edward Boyd. She also appeared as Soviet spy Flo Mayhew in two episodes of the series Callan, starring Edward Woodward.

Lawson played the prison governor in the final season of Within These Walls, in 1978, the third actress after Googie Withers and Katharine Blake, to play the role.

Personal life
In 1960 she married actor Patrick Allen: the couple had two sons, Stephen and Stuart. Allen and Lawson remained married until his death in July 2006.

Selected filmography
 Face to Face (1951 film) (1951) - Myrtle Beringer (live broadcast, 30th. Jan.) (Diana Dors' tv. début)
 The Browning Version (1951) - Betty Carstairs
 The Night Won't Talk (1952) - Sue / Susan
 Street Corner (1953) - WDC Joyce
 Three Steps in the Dark (1953) - Dorothy
 Meet Mr. Malcolm (1954) - Louie Knowles
 You Know What Sailors Are (1954) - Betty
 The Blue Peter (1955) - Gwyneth Thomas
 It's Never Too Late (1956) - Anne Hammond
 Three Crooked Men (1958) - May Wescott
 Links of Justice (1958) - Clare Mills
 The Solitary Child (1958) - Ann
 Night Without Pity (1962) - Diana Martin
 On the Run (1963) - Helen Carr
 The World Ten Times Over (1963) - Elizabeth
 Night of the Big Heat (1967) - Frankie Callum
 The Devil Rides Out (1968) - Marie Eaton
 Battle of Britain (1969) - Skipper's Wife
 The Stud'' (1978) - Anne Khaled

References

External links

Alumni of the Webber Douglas Academy of Dramatic Art
British film actresses
British radio actresses
British television actresses
Actresses from London
1928 births
Living people